Doherty High School may refer to:
 Doherty High School (Colorado) in Colorado Springs, Colorado
 Doherty Memorial High School in Worcester, Massachusetts